Idan Maimon (born 27 November 1974) is an Israeli former handball player, and currently the head coach of Hapoel Rishon Lezion. Maimon was the captain of the Israeli national handball team, and the all-time top goalscorer of the Israeli handball with more than 3,000 goals (the previous record held by Akiva Lefler). He's considered to the best Israeli handball player of all-time. Maimon usually played in the right-back position, but also played as center-back. Maimon wore the shirt no. 9.

Biography 
Maimon born & raised in Rishon Lezion, Israel. His father played and coached handball so his family had a background of this game. Maimon started playing handball in the youth teams of Hapoel Rishon Lezion until he was moved to the squad of the senior team. Hapoel Rishon Lezion is the only team Maimon ever played for in Israel. In 1992, Maimon was part of the win of his high school, Amit Amal, in the High Schools World Championship took place in Denmark. During his career, Maimon gathered a lot of titles: 13 championships and 12 cups, all in Hapoel Rishon Lezion. Maimon was also part of the two historic participations of the club in the EHF Champions League, while in the second participation of the club in the competition, Hapoel reached the quarter-final but lost to the German titans THW Kiel.

At the beginning of 2014/15 season, Maimon announced that he will retire at the end of the season. However, after winning Maccabi Rishon Lezion in the cup final and in the league play-off final and achieving a double, Maimon decided to continue playing for another season. During 2015/16 season, the head coach of Hapoel, Damir Stojanovic, was fired, and Hapoel board asked Maimon, who never coached a senior team before, to take charge as a player/coach for the rest of the season. Maimon accepted the offer and served as player/coach for the rest of the season. On 29 February 2016, in his second game as a coach, Maimon helped his team to win the local rivals Maccabi Rishon in the cup final and won his 12th domestic cup as player and first as head coach.

At the end of the season, Maimon announced a retirement in a press-conference. He was appointed to the head coach of Hapoel Rishon.

Maimon was also the first Israeli player to play abroad, as he played two years in Frisch Auf Goppingen and helped them to promote from the 2. Bundesliga to the Bundesliga, but then he decided to come back to Israel and signed with Hapoel Rishon. Maimon got a lot of offers from Hapoel local rivals, Maccabi Rishon, and Maccabi Tel Aviv during his career, but rejected them.

Idan's father, Kobi, served as head coach for Hapoel for some years and for other teams. His brother, Omri, is the head coach of HC Holon.

Honours
Israeli Championship (14): 1990, 1991, 1993, 1994, 1995, 1996, 1997, 1998, 1999, 2003, 2004, 2008, 2013, 2015
Israeli Cup (12): 1990, 1991, 1992, 1993, 1994, 1995, 1996, 1997, 1998, 1999, 2012, 2015
German 2nd Division (1): 2001

References

1974 births
Living people
Israeli male handball players
Israeli Jews
Frisch Auf Göppingen players
Sportspeople from Rishon LeZion
Israeli expatriate sportspeople in Germany